Lemcke is a German language surname from the personal name Lambrecht. Notable people with the name include:
 Andreas Lemcke (1959), German speed skater
 Carl von Lemcke (1831–1913), German aesthetician and art historian
 Christian Lemcke (1850–1894), German otolaryngologist
 Julius Augustus Lemcke (1832–1911), State Treasurer of Indiana
 Ludwig Lemcke (1816–1884), German Romance philologist and literary historian
 Walter Lemcke (1891–1955), German sculptor

See also 
 Lemke (surname)

References 

German-language surnames
Surnames from given names